On the Spot is an American game show produced by and broadcast on KGW-TV in Portland, Oregon as a daily series from September 1984 to October 1988. Newscaster Larry Blackmar was host, while local disc-jockey Michael Bailey announced.

The series was based on an original concept created by Douglas K. Vernon, who at the time was a videotape editor for KGW.

Gameplay
Three contestants, one usually a returning champion, competed. Each player was spotted 1,000 points at the beginning of the game.

Round 1

Category Board
At the beginning of the round, all three players were shown a category board consisting of six categories to be used for the entire game. Each category had three lighted triangles, each representing a different multiple-choice toss-up question to be asked. The players were given ten seconds to study and memorize the category board before it was turned away from view. The players had to keep track of the category names and the number of questions asked in each category in the round by memory.

Toss-up Question
Round 1 began with a non-category question, a question whose category did not come from the category board. The players could buzz in to answer the question at any time with a maximum of five seconds after the question was asked. If a player buzzed in with a correct answer, 100 points were added to their score and the player earned the right to choose one of the categories from the category board.

Category Questions
A question from the chosen category, worth 100 points, was then asked to all three players in the same manner. If the first player to buzz in gave an incorrect answer or failed to answer the question within five seconds, 100 points was deducted from their score and the question was repeated for their two opponents.

If the second player to buzz in gave an incorrect answer or failed to answer within five seconds, 100 points were deducted from their score, a new non-category toss-up question was asked (this also applied, minus the point deductions, if no contestant buzzed in with an answer).

Exhausted Category
If at any time a player who answered a question correctly chose a category that had already been "exhausted" (all three questions from it were already asked), 100 points were deducted from their score and a new non-category toss-up question was asked.

The round was played until either all categories were exhausted or until five minutes elapsed (signified by a ringing bell).

Round 2
Round 2 was played like Round 1, with the category board shown once again to the players. However, there were some changes.
 Correct answers added 200 points, while incorrect answers deducted 200 points.
 200 points were deducted for choosing an exhausted category.

Passing
Each player, after giving a correct answer, had the option of choosing a category or passing their turn to one of their opponents, forcing that player to choose a category. However, the players were limited to one pass per game.

A good strategy was for a contestant to pass their turn near the end of the round, when there were several exhausted categories.

Spotlight Question
One pre-designated question in the second round was a somewhat more difficult question that only the player that found it could answer. If a player chose a category and that next question was the Spotlight, they could wager from 100-500 points on it. A correct answer added the wager to their score, while an incorrect answer deducted it.

The category and question position of the Spotlight was shown to the home audience during the category board reveal for Round 2.

Winning
The player with the highest score at the end of Round 2 won the game plus a prize, while their opponents received consolation gifts (including gift certificates from local stores/restaurants). All contestants received an On the Spot umbrella made by Shedrain.

Flash Round
The day's champion played the "Flash Round" for up to $1,000 cash and one of two prizes (ranging from furniture to trips to a new car, all provided by local stores and dealerships).

Wheels
The champion was shown a special wheel-within-a-wheel setup (similar to the Melody Roulette wheel on Name That Tune). The inner wheel contained two sets of dollar wedges (worth $25, $50, $75, and $100) while the outer wheel contained two wedges each of the names of two grand prizes. The champion spun the wheels to determine the dollar amount of each question and which grand prize they would play for.

Questions
The champion then had 60 seconds to answer 10 questions. The clock started after the first question was completely asked, and each correct answer earned the amount of money the inner wheel landed on.

Contestants were not penalized for incorrect answers, which allowed them to give as many answers to each question as possible until the correct answer was given. They may also pass on questions, returning to them if time remains.

If all ten questions were answered correctly, the contestant won the grand prize the outer wheel landed on. All money earned was theirs to keep regardless of outcome.

Returning champions
Champions remained on the show until they were defeated or won five consecutive games, after which they were retired. The maximum possible cash amount that a contestant could win was $5,000.

Changes
Starting with the 1985-1986 season, the series made a number of changes to the game.

1985
 During the first commercial break in the middle of Round 1, the players were shown the category board for the second time, including the number of questions that were played from each category at that point.
 The player who chose the category containing the last question in either round had 100 points added to their score.
 The Spotlight Question became home-viewer driven. Viewers sent in their questions, and if the question was used they won an On the Spot t-shirt (later a gift certificate to a local store/restaurant).
 All $25 wedges were eliminated from the inner Flash Round wheel. In addition, Blackmar paid out winnings in bills of money (similar to The Joker’s Wild).

$5K Giveaway (1987-1988)
For the final season, a "$5K Giveaway" was instituted as the third grand prize in the "Flash Round". Presented in association with KGW's AM radio sister-station 62 KGW, the "$5K Giveaway" gave winning contestants a chance to play for $5,000.

A small wedge marked "62 KGW" was added in one of the spaces between the two grand prizes on the outer wheel. If the outer wheel landed on the special wedge and the contestant won the bonus game, they received a $5,000 check in addition to the cash amounts earned for each correct answer.

Each time a contestant returned to the bonus game, an additional wedge was added to another space between the two grand prizes on the outer wheel, thus increasing the chances of playing for the $5,000. On the fifth and final trip to the bonus game, the contestant was given another wedge to place in any position on the wheel.

On the Spot High School Challenge
Beginning in 1985 and played during the school year, a weekly Saturday version used local-area high-school students as contestants, playing for cash and prizes along with scholarship money for their schools. Scott Runkel from South Salem High School was a contestant in 1987 and later recalled (in 2017), "It was really, really annoying that you had to remember all the categories and how many questions had been asked in each one." He did not do very well on the show as a result.

Set
The set was designed and built by All West Display Company of Portland, Oregon. For the 1984-1985 season, the set utilized a gold color scheme. This was changed to a blue color scheme for the rest of the run.

External links
 Larry Blackmar's official website
 Shedrain Umbrellas
 News article on the death of announcer Michael Bailey

1980s American game shows
1984 American television series debuts
1988 American television series endings
Culture of Portland, Oregon
Local game shows in the United States
Student quiz television series